Akka Pettanam Chelleli Kapuram is a 1993 Indian Telugu-language drama film, produced by Maganti Sudhakar under the Siva Shakthi Studios Pvt. Ltd. & Prabhu Films banner and directed by Dasari Narayana Rao. It stars Rajendra Prasad, Aparna, Jayasudha  and music composed by Vasu Rao. The film was a remake of the Tamil movie Pondatti Rajyam (1992). The film did not fare well commercially.

Plot
Satyanarayana (Rajendra Prasad) a young & energetic guy works as a General Manager in pickle factory headed By Ammaji (Y. Vijaya) & Brahmaji (Kota Srinivasa Rao). Once he gets acquainted with a beautiful innocent girl Chinni (Aparna) and both of them fall in love. Chinni is a marionette in the hands of her elder sister Ranganayaki (Jayasudha), a men hater who believes as all the men as deceivers. At present, Satyanarayana moves to Ranganayaki with the wedding proposal when she keeps few tests and ultimately, couple up them. Soon after, Ranganayaki spoils Chinni's mind and creates suspicion on her husband for everything. After some comic incidents, Satyanarayana leaves for a camp, on his way back, he meets his childhood soulmate Radha Krishna (Vikram) who introduces him to his fiancé Sona (Srikanya), as they are orphans Satyanarayana decides to make their espousal. During that time, unfortunately, Radha Krishna dies in an accident while protecting Satyanarayana against harm and by that time, Sona is pregnant. Now Satyanarayana takes up Sona's responsibility but due to the fear of his wife, he keeps her at his company's guest house. At the same time, Chinni also becomes pregnant, both of them give birth to baby boys. Thereafter, the truth comes forward, Chinni reaches Sona and creates a huge plight on the provocation of Ranganayaki. The rest of the story is how Satyanarayana gets rid of these problems and makes people understand their relationship is sacred.

Cast

Rajendra Prasad as Satyanarayana 
Aparna as Chinni
Jaya Sudha as Ranganayaki
Vikram as Radha Krishna
Kota Srinivasa Rao as Brahmaji
Babu Mohan as Peon Satyam
Suthi Velu 
Vallabhaneni Janardhan
Ashok Kumar
Ananth as Waiter
Maganti Sudhakar
Srikanya as Sona
Chandrika
Rekha
Radha Prashanti as Radha
Jayalalita
Y. Vijaya as Ammaji

Production 
Vikram debuted in Telugu with this film. This is the second film for Aparna after Sundarakanda (2002). After this film, she quit acting, got married and settled in America.

Soundtrack

Music composed by Vasu Rao. Music released on Supreme Music Company.

References

External links

Indian comedy-drama films
Films directed by Dasari Narayana Rao
Telugu remakes of Tamil films
1993 comedy-drama films
1993 films